Nine day week may refer to time intervals used in:
the medieval Lithuanian calendar
possibly the medieval Welsh calendar